The 1000 meters distance for women in the 2013–14 ISU Speed Skating World Cup was contested over six races on six occasions, out of a total of six World Cup occasions for the season, with the first occasion taking place in Calgary, Alberta, Canada, on 8–10 November 2013, and the final occasion taking place in Heerenveen, Netherlands, on 14–16 March 2014.

On 17 November 2013, at the World Cup stop in Salt Lake City, Brittany Bowe of the United States broke the world record with a time of 1:12.58.

Kim Hyun-yung of South Korea broke the girls' world record, first in Calgary on 10 November, with a time of 1:15.18, then again in Salt Lake City one week later, with a time of 1:14.95.

Heather Richardson of the United States defended her title from the previous season, while compatriot Brittany Bowe repeated her second place, and Olga Fatkulina of Russia came third.

Top three

Race medallists

Standings 
Standings as of 16 March 2014 (end of the season).

References 

 
Women 1000
ISU